Aan Baan is a 1972 Bollywood drama film directed by Prakash Mehra. The film stars Rajendra Kumar and Raakhee.

Plot summary
Raja Bahadur rules his region, although fully aware that his days as King are numbered. Nevertheless, he indulges in women, alcohol, and high-living - most of which is through borrowed money, with the creditors threatening to take him to court. He even has an affair with prostitute named Dulari, who he refuses to marry, and has her brother, Kundan, sent to jail. When his brother, Suraj, returns from abroad, Bahadur decides to withhold this information from him. In order to keep up appearances, Bahadur gets his men to rob their neighbor, Hiralal's house, of all jewellery and cash. But Hiralal wakes up, calls for help and for the police, and one of Bahadur's men is arrested. When Bahadur finds out that the police have traced him to his house, Suraj decides to take the rap for him, is arrested and imprisoned. On Suraj's return, Bahadur announces his marriage to Rekha, Hiralal's daughter. The problem is that Suraj and Rekha love each other, and the question is will Suraj be willing to make another sacrifice for his brother this time?

Cast
Rajendra Kumar as Suraj
Pran as Raja Bahadur
Bhagwan Dada as Prisoner #420
Brahm Bhardwaj as Saudagarmal
Som Dutt as Inspector Ranvir
Raakhee as Rekha
Anwar Hussain as Kundan
Jagdeep as Bankhe
Kanhaiyalal as Dhaniram
 Kumkum as Dulari
Ram Mohan as Shankar
Moolchand as Wedding guest
Amin Sayani as Radio announcer
Shivraj as Khajanchi Girdharilal
Sunder as Rambhai
 Gulshan Kumar Mehta (Gulshan Bawra) as train passenger with radio

Soundtrack

External links
 

1972 films
1970s Hindi-language films
1972 drama films
Films directed by Prakash Mehra
Films scored by Shankar–Jaikishan